Erich Hamann (born 27 November 1944) is a retired German football player who played as a midfielder. He was also the manager of Vorwärts Frankfurt and Hanse Frankfurt.

Club career 
He played for the clubs SC Neubrandenburg and FC Vorwärts Frankfurt/Oder in the East German top-flight.

International career 
Hamann earned 3 caps for the East Germany national football team, and played in the 1974 FIFA World Cup, including the historic match against West Germany, where he provided the pass to Jürgen Sparwasser, who scored the only goal in the 1–0 win.

Managerial career
Hamann held multiple roles at Vorwärts Frankfurt, including manager, assistant manager and reserve team manager, and was also manager at Hanse Frankfurt.

References

External links
 
 
 
 Erich Hamann at RSSSF
 

1944 births
Living people
People from Pasewalk
German footballers
East German footballers
East Germany international footballers
1974 FIFA World Cup players
1. FC Frankfurt players
Eisenhüttenstädter FC Stahl players
DDR-Oberliga players
Association football midfielders
Footballers from Mecklenburg-Western Pomerania
1. FC Neubrandenburg 04 players